Uroballus kinabalu is a species of spider of the genus Uroballus. It is endemic to the Malaysian part of Borneo.

This species is closest to Uroballus koponeni. U. koponeni has different spermathecal chambers, longer spinnerets, and long abdominal hairs.

Distribution
Uroballus kinabalu has been described only from one female, which was collected in 1992, by night fogging from tree canopies in Mt. Kinabalu National Park, North Borneo. The tree species it was found on was Xanthophylum affine.

Description
The body of the female is about 3 mm long. On its back, it has 4-5 transverse brownish stripes. As in other Uroballus, the spinnerets are long.

References

Salticidae
Endemic fauna of Borneo
Spiders of Asia
Spiders described in 2018
Fauna of Mount Kinabalu